Simone Bianchi may refer to:

Simone Bianchi (athlete) (born 1973), Italian long-jumper
Simone Bianchi (artist) (born 1972), Italian comic book artist, painter, and graphic artist